Julie Sze is Professor of American Studies at University of California, Davis. Her research deals with environmental justice, inequality and culture; race, gender and power; and community health and activism.

Education 
Sze grew up in the Chinatown neighborhood of New York City. She received her B.A. from the University of California, Berkeley in 1995. Sze earned her Ph.D. in American Studies from New York University in 2003. She then joined the faculty at the University of California, Davis where she was promoted to professor in 2015.

Career 
She is the author of three books: Noxious New York: The Racial Politics of Urban Health and Environmental Justice (MIT Press, 2007), for which she won the 2008 John Hope Franklin Prize, Fantasy Islands: Chinese Dreams and Ecological Fears in an Age of Climate Crisis (University of California Press, 2015), and Environmental Justice in a Moment of Danger (University of California Press, 2020). The latter offers a “primer” on activism for environmental justice.

Selected publications

References

External links 
 

Living people
University of California, Berkeley alumni
New York University alumni
University of California, Davis faculty
Environmental justice scholars
American studies
Year of birth missing (living people)